Kickball (also known as soccer baseball in most of Canada and  football rounders in the United Kingdom) is a team sport and league game, similar to baseball. As in baseball, one team tries to score by having its players return a ball from home base to the field and then circle the bases, while the other team tries to stop them by tagging them "out" with the ball before they can return to the home base. Instead of hitting a small, hard ball with a bat, players kick an inflated rubber ball; this makes it more accessible to young children. As in baseball, teams alternate half-innings. The team with the most runs after a predefined number of innings wins.

Kickball is a popular playground game and is typically played among young, school-age children. The lack of both specialized equipment and highly skill-based positions (like pitcher) makes the game an accessible introduction to other sports such as baseball and softball.

History
Kickball, originally called "Kicking Baseball" was claimed to have been invented as early as 1910 by Dr. Emmett Dunn Angell in his noted book Play: Comprising Games for the Kindergarten, Playground, Schoolroom and College : How to Coach and Play Girls' Basket-ball, Etc (1910). His description and field illustration in this book is both the closest and earliest known precursor to the modern game of kickball. He also notes that "The game seems to afford equal enjoyment to the children and it gives a better understanding of the national game (Baseball), and at the same time affords them an exercise that is not too violent and is full of fun.".

A later documented inventor claim, as early as 1917, was by Nicholas C Seuss, Supervisor of Cincinnati Park Playgrounds in Cincinnati, Ohio. Seuss submitted his first documented overview of the game which included 12 rules and a field diagram in The Playground Book, published in 1917. Kickball is referred to as "Kick Base Ball" and "Kick Baseball" in this book.
 
Around 1920–1921 "Kick Ball" was used by physical education teachers in public schools to teach young boys and girls the basics of baseball. Around this time, the ball that was used was a soccer ball or volleyball. It was played by ten to thirty players and the field included a "Neutral Zone": an area not to be entered until the ball has actually been kicked. There was no pitcher as the ball would be kicked from the home area, which was a 3 ft circle. The ball must pass beyond the 5 foot line. Base-runners could only advance one base on infield balls. Teams would switch sides only after all team members have kicked.

During this time, it was played on the same field as baseball except that there was only one base corresponding to a baseball diamond's 2nd base. Multiple players could be on base at a time, but all needed to get home before the last kicker kicked and the kicking order had retired.

There were also two short stop player positions: one between 1st and 2nd and the other between 2nd and 3rd. Home plate was marked by a 3 ft by 4 ft rectangle on the ground.

Published in April 1922, Daniel Chase; Supervisor of Physical Education for the New York State Department of Education, describes the earliest known account of adults playing kickball. This game took place at a conference of rural teachers in Mooers Forks, Clinton County, NY where Daniel was teaching games that the teachers could in turn teach to their pupils. They did not have a ball, so they made one out of an old stocking and some rags. The ball was about 7 to 8 inches long and tied off with an old shoelace. The construction of this makeshift ball was demonstrated to the rural teachers by Mr. Braddock Wells. The teachers were assigned numbers to create teams; odd numbers on one team and even numbers on the other. The team captains chose college names to represent each team name. The odds chose Yale & the evens chose Princeton. The game of "Kick Baseball" was the last game they played at the conference to decide the championship for the day. Ten players were chosen for each team and the remaining were organized into a cheering section. Yale kicked first. On the field there was no pitcher, but an extra short-stop between first and second. Only three innings were completed in the heat that day, with Yale ending up as the victor winning 3 to 2.  The cheering sections showed great sportsmanship, applauding all good plays impartially.

American World War II correspondent Ernie Pyle reported it being played by U.S. soldiers during the Tunisia Campaign, 1942–43.

"Kick Ball" was promoted as an informal game for soldiers by the United States Department of the Army as early as 1943. In this variant of the game, all kicks had to be home runs, by beating the kicked ball back to home after consecutive passes to all basemen before throwing them out at home.

Field
The game is typically played on a softball diamond with an 8.5 inch to 16 inch diameter inflated rubber ball. As in baseball/softball, the game uses 3 bases, a pitcher's mound, and a home plate. Sometimes, in less formal games, the field is not bounded by a fence as in softball or baseball, but is open. This may result in informal rule changes to accommodate the field, such as home runs being counted by number of bounces instead of by distance. Also it can be played on a rectangular blacktop area with chalk or paint outlines.

Popularity in the United States
In the past, kickball was mostly considered a child's game in the United States, although recently many US cities have created kickball leagues for adults. Some US cities have multiple organized leagues for adults over 21 years of age.  It gained prominence in the 1970s.

Popularity outside the United States
Kickball is popular among youth in South Korea. Known as balyagu [발야구 (foot-baseball)], it is a staple in PE classes within elementary schools.  Kickball is referred to as Soccer-Baseball, Chinese Baseball or California Kickball in some parts of Canada.  In Japan kickball is played by elementary school students and is known as キックベース(Kickbase). In England, the variation is often played in P.E. lessons in schools and is referred to as 'Football-Rounders', a mix of association football and rounders. A related sport of kickingball is also popular in South America, played by Venezuelan refugees in Argentina.

See also
 Matball
 Baseball
 Leg cricket
 Baseball5 - baseball with only a ball, batters hit the ball with a hand

References

External links

 
 
 
 

Baseball genres
Ball games
Sports originating in the United States